The National Foundation for Teachers' Welfare is a charitable foundation established by the Indian Government in 1962. The organisation is responsible for providing "relief to teachers and their dependants who may be in indigent circumstances". The Foundation receives funding from the Government of India and state members

The foundation has provided financial assistance for the children of teachers to study engineering, medicine and management at university

References

1962 establishments in Andhra Pradesh
Government agencies established in 1962
Government agencies of India
Teaching in India
Ministry of Education (India)